Moncrief is a surname of Scottish origin.  Notable people with the surname include:

 Brianne Moncrief (born 1983), American actress
 Donte Moncrief (born 1993), American football player
 James Moncrief (1741–1793), British military engineer
 Mike Moncrief, American politician in Texas
 Raleigh Moncrief, American musician
 Sidney Moncrief (born 1957), American basketball player
 Vincent Moncrief, American mathematician and physicist
 William Moncrief (1920–2021), American businessman
 Zac Moncrief (born 1971), American animator

See also
Moncrieff (disambiguation)
Moncreiffe (disambiguation)

Scottish surnames